Hubert Andrzej Olejnik (born 15 April 1982) is a Slovak sport shooter.

He participated at the 2018 ISSF World Shooting Championships, winning a medal.

References

External links

Living people
1982 births
Slovak male sport shooters
Polish male sport shooters
Trap and double trap shooters
Sportspeople from Wrocław
Slovak people of Polish descent
Shooters at the 2015 European Games
European Games competitors for Slovakia